Getting Go: The Go Doc Project is a 2013 pseudo-documentary film written and directed by Cory James Krueckeberg.

Plot
Doc (Tanner Cohen) is an average gay college student awaiting graduation and living in New York City; his social life is mostly on the web.  He is obsessed with Go (Matthew Camp), a hot go-go dancer at various clubs. Doc spends his evenings creating photoshopped nude photos of Go. One night he drunkenly sends an email to Go pretending to make a documentary about the NYC club scene and asking if Go would be the subject of the film. Surprisingly, Go replies and agrees to be filmed. The fake film project becomes a reality as Doc follows Go through his daily routine and sees what life is like for him. The two grow closer to each other eventually becoming a couple. Doc comes out of his shell and Go proves to be a lot deeper than the shallow façade he displays.

Cast

 Tanner Cohen as Doc
 Matthew Camp as Go
 Ramon O. Torres  as Actor 
 Judy McLane	 as Actress
 Tedd Merrit	 as Actor
 Thorgy Thor    as herself (Uncredited)

Release

Film festivals
 USA	4 March 2013 Miami International Film Festival
 USA	21 June 2013 Frameline Film Festival
 Japan	13 July 2013 Tokyo International Lesbian & Gay Film Festival
 USA	8 September 2013 New Fest
 USA	28 April 2014 QFest St. Louis 
 Israel 16 June 2014 Tel Aviv International LGBT Film Festival

Theatrical
 Spain 7 November 2014 Madrid, Spain.

Home media
Released on DVD in Europe on 28 March 2014, and in North America on 5 August 2014.

Awards and nominations
 Seattle LGBT Film Festival - Honorable Mention, Narrative Feature
 Rhode Island International Film Festival - Best LGBT Film
 Toronto "Inside Out" Film Festival - Special Jury Award
 North Carolina Gay and Lesbian Film Festival - Emerging Film Award/Best Men's Feature
 Tel Aviv International LGBT Film Festival - Honorable Mention.

External links
 
 Interview: Tanner Cohen, star of new gay film Getting Go
 
Film trailer

References

2013 films
American LGBT-related films
American independent films
2010s English-language films
2010s American films